Pyrausta limbopunctalis is a species of moth in the family Crambidae. It is found in Portugal, Spain, on Sardinia and in Russia, Turkey and North Africa, including Morocco.

Subspecies
Pyrausta limbopunctalis limbopunctalis
Pyrausta limbopunctalis congeneralis (Guenee, 1854)
Pyrausta limbopunctalis frustalis (Herrich-Schaffer, 1861)
Pyrausta limbopunctalis sardinialis (Guenee, 1854) (Sardinia)

References

Moths described in 1849
limbopunctalis
Moths of Europe
Moths of Asia
Moths of Africa